Mabel Annie Newlands (née Fielding, 1 July 1902 – 13 February 1983), known as Mabel Newlands and also Ann Newlands, was a New Zealand community leader. Born in Pleasant Point, New Zealand, on 1 July 1902, she was a key member of the New Zealand delegation that participated in the drafting of the Universal Declaration of Human Rights and Justice of the Peace.

References

1902 births
1983 deaths
New Zealand Labour Party politicians
New Zealand Baptists
People from Pleasant Point, New Zealand
20th-century New Zealand politicians
Unsuccessful candidates in the 1946 New Zealand general election
New Zealand city councillors
20th-century Baptists
20th-century New Zealand women politicians